The Ruidoso River Museum is located in Ruidoso, New Mexico. The collection features artifacts, photographs and documents relating to the notable figures of the Old West and those involved in the Lincoln County War, including Billy the Kid, sheriffs William Brady and Pat Garrett and lawyer and businessman Alexander McSween. It houses the world's largest collection of Billy the Kid and Pat Garrett items. The museum also houses a range of archaeological relics and celebrity memorabilia.
Notable museum items include Pat Garrett's solid gold sheriff's badge, Billy the Kid's rifle, and Pat Garrett's original Colt Model 1877 Thunderer revolver.

The museum was rated number 8 among True West magazine's "2009 Top 10 Western Museums".
In 2010, the museum was featured on The Travel Channel's Mysteries At The Museum Season 1 Episode 7: Volume 7.

References

External links 
 
 Pat Garrett’s original Colt Model 1877 Thunderer Revolver
 Pat Garrett’s solid gold Sheriff’s badge
 Pat Garrett’s solid gold Sheriff’s badge
 Exterior of the Museum (1) 
 Exterior of the Museum (2) 

Museums in Lincoln County, New Mexico
American West museums in New Mexico